Carlos Alvarado Villalobos (born 19 December 1927) was a Costa Rican footballer who played as a goalkeeper. He also represented Costa Rica at international level.

Club career
Known as "Aguilucho", he was born in Santa Bárbara, Heredia, Alvarado played as a goalkeeper. He began his career with L.D. Alajuelense, making his Costa Rican Primera División debut in 1945.  Alvarado spent most of his career with Alajuelense, winning six Primera División titles in the process. There, he earned the nickname "Aguilucho" (hawk) for the aggressive manner in which he attacked opponents trying to score. He would play 159 league games for Liga.

Alvarado began playing professional football with Mexican Primera División side Club América in 1947. He returned to Alajuelense after one season, and would spend three months in Colombia with América de Cali during 1950.

In a 1951 match against the Boca Juniors, Alvarado blocked a critical penalty shot in the 90th minute. Costa Rican president Otilio Ulate Blanco gave Alvarado his watch, which he stopped at the moment Alvarado blocked the shot.

During his career, Alvarado turned down offers to play for Italy's Genoa C.F.C. and Argentina's Boca Juniors.

International career
Alvarado made 25 appearances for the Costa Rica national football team, making his debut in 1946. He helped Costa Rica win the CCCF Championship three times (1953, 1955 and 1960).

References

External links

Profile at LDA.cr

1927 births
Living people
People from Santa Bárbara (canton)
Association football goalkeepers
Costa Rican footballers
Costa Rica international footballers
L.D. Alajuelense footballers
Club América footballers
América de Cali footballers
Liga FPD players
Categoría Primera A players
Liga MX players
Costa Rican expatriate footballers
Expatriate footballers in Mexico
Expatriate footballers in Colombia
Costa Rican expatriate sportspeople in Mexico
Costa Rican expatriate sportspeople in Colombia